Anthene chryseostictus, the medium red-spot ciliate blue, is a butterfly in the family Lycaenidae. It is found in Guinea, Sierra Leone, Liberia, Ivory Coast, Ghana, Togo, Nigeria (south and the Cross River loop), Cameroon, the Republic of the Congo, the Democratic Republic of the Congo (Mongala, Uele and Lualaba), Uganda and north-western Tanzania. The habitat consists of forests.

References

Butterflies described in 1910
Anthene